The Capitulation of Saldanha Bay was the surrender in 1796 to the British Royal Navy of a Dutch expeditionary force sent to recapture the Dutch Cape Colony. In 1794, early in the French Revolutionary Wars, the army of the French Republic overran the Dutch Republic which then became a French client state, the Batavian Republic. Great Britain was concerned by the threat the Dutch Cape Colony in Southern Africa posed to its trade routes to British India. It therefore sent an expeditionary force that landed at Simon's Town in June 1795 and forced the surrender of the colony in a short campaign. The British commander, Vice-Admiral Sir George Elphinstone, then reinforced the garrison and stationed a naval squadron at the Cape to protect the captured colony.

The Batavian government, not yet aware of the capture of the Cape Colony, but worried by rumors of the loss of this and other colonies of the Dutch East India Company (which was about to be nationalized by the Batavian Republic, because it was virtually bankrupt), in November 1795 decided to send an expeditionary force to the Dutch East Indies by way of  the Cape, and if necessary recapture the colony. This force comprised three ships of the line and six smaller vessels, all under the command of Rear-Admiral Engelbertus Lucas. Security regarding the plans was weak and the British knew of the operation before Lucas had sailed.

The British warned Elphinstone, who further reinforced the Cape. Lucas's journey took nearly six months, with his squadron suffering shortages of drinking water leading to a near-mutinous state among his crews. On its arrival at the Cape, the Batavian squadron anchored in Saldanha Bay to take on fresh water before deciding to abandon the operation and sail to the French base at Île de France in the Western Indian Ocean.

On 15 August 1796 Elphinstone's larger fleet discovered Lucas's force and trapped it in the bay. Aware that resistance would be futile and with his crews in open revolt, Lucas surrendered unconditionally. The ships of the captured Batavian force were taken into the Royal Navy, joining the squadron at the Cape; Elphinstone was later made Baron Keith in recognition of his achievements. The Batavian operation did however force the cancellation of a planned British invasion of Île de France. Lucas faced a court martial on his return to the Netherlands, but died before it began. The main responsibility for the debacle was laid at his feet but his death forestalled a conviction for dereliction of duty. All other officers were acquitted. The Cape Colony was not attacked again before the end of the war in 1802, when the Treaty of Amiens returned it to the Batavian Republic.

Background
In the winter of 1794 the army of the French Republic overran the Dutch Republic. Dutch opponents of the stadtholder William V, known as Patriots (as opposed to the adherents of the stadtholder, who were known as "Orangists"), many of whom had returned with the French forces from exile in France, proclaimed the Batavian Republic after the Batavian Revolution in January 1795. This event alarmed the government of Great Britain, erstwhile allies of the Dutch Republic in the War of the First Coalition, as the Dutch Empire controlled a number of strategically important colonies in the East Indies. The key to controlling European access to the region was the Dutch Cape Colony on the tip of Southern Africa; a naval force based there could dominate the trade routes between Europe and the East Indies, in particular the economically vital links between Britain and British India.

To ensure that the Cape Colony did not become a French naval base, the Secretary of State for War, Henry Dundas, ordered a large expeditionary force to sail for the Cape in March 1795. The force comprised two squadrons and 500 troops, all under the overall control of Vice-Admiral Sir George Elphinstone; more substantial reinforcements followed. Arriving on 10 June in False Bay, Elphinstone then conducted two months of fruitless negotiations with the government at the Cape, led by Abraham Josias Sluysken. On 7 August, with negotiations stalled, Elphinstone ordered an attack on Dutch positions at Muizenberg. The Dutch defenders withdrew, but Elphinstone's forces were low on food and ammunition and not numerous enough to launch a major attack on Cape Town. On 14 September the arrival of British reinforcements under General Alured Clarke convinced Sluysken to surrender the colony.

Elphinstone turned his attention to planning operations against the Dutch East Indies and the French island base of Île de France. He sailed for Madras in his flagship  to take command of the East Indies Station, but maintained a strong garrison and naval presence at the Cape under Sir James Henry Craig and Commodore John Blankett. Much of his squadron subsequently dispersed on operations across the Indian Ocean. While Elphinstone was consolidating his position, the Batavian government determined in November 1795 to send an expedition to inspect its new colonies in the Dutch East Indies, as the previous owner, the Dutch East India Company, was about to be nationalized (in March 1796). The expedition was to call at the Cape on its way; if that colony had been captured, an attempt at recapture could be made, but only if this was feasible. The expedition did not carry a large number of troops or boats to land them. If the colony was in enemy hands the expedition was to bypass the Cape and sail directly for Île de France. A squadron was prepared under the command of Rear-Admiral Engelbertus Lucas, who had sailed to the East Indies once in 1786, but otherwise had no experience of long expeditionary campaigns. His force comprised three 66-gun ships of the line, Dordrecht, Tromp, and Revolutie, and six smaller warships. After calling at the Cape, Lucas was to continue his expedition in order to reinforce the Dutch East Indies.

Lucas's voyage
Lucas's expeditionary force sailed from the Texel on 23 February 1796, together with another squadron destined for the Dutch West Indies, under vice-admiral Adriaan Braak, intending to pass through the North Sea and around Scotland before entering the Atlantic and turning south. Unspecified French support for the operation had been promised by the National Convention, but did not materialise. The British North Sea Fleet was actively blockading the Texel and the 16-gun brig  sighted the Batavian force putting to sea. Espiegle shadowed Lucas throughout the day, sending a message to Admiral Adam Duncan at Great Yarmouth. On 26 February a small British squadron led by Captain Henry Trollope in  detached from the cruising division of Rear-Admiral Thomas Pringle and encountered the Batavians, the weaker British making off as Lucas formed a line of battle.

Having successfully evaded pursuit, Lucas followed his planned route, arriving at Las Palmas on Gran Canaria on 13 April. The journey had not been unobserved: a small British warship, the 20-gun  under Captain Charles Brisbane, had sighted the Batavian force near Madeira while Mozelle was escorting two merchant ships to Barbados. Leaving the merchant ships to make their way unescorted, Mozelle followed Lucas for several days and then sailed south with all haste to bring a warning to the Cape. Despite noticing Mozelle, Lucas decided not to attack her.

After spending no less than 34 days taking on water and supplies at Las Palmas, Lucas on 26 May sailed to Praia on Cape Verde, before continuing south on 29 May in the direction of the Brazilian coast, hoping to profit from favourable trade winds and currents. In fact, due to persistent calms in the doldrums, the squadron only reached a position off the Brazilian shore on 27 June. The delay led Lucas to decide not to take in more water but to sail directly to the Cape. The Batavian expeditionary force did not encounter another vessel during this time and thus had no information regarding British dispositions when it eventually reached the South-African coast on 26 July. After a council of war aboard Dordrecht, Lucas decided not to reconnoitre Table Bay and on 6 August the squadron anchored in Saldanha Bay.

British agents had observed Lucas's preparations in the Netherlands and reported them in January, more than a month before the expedition sailed. The British Admiralty sent the frigate  to the Cape with a warning. Carysfort arrived at the Cape in April, but vague accounts of Lucas's mission had reached Elphinstone even earlier, appearing at Madras in March, less than a month after Lucas's departure from the Texel. Sailing from Madras on 23 March, Elphinstone reached the Cape on 23 May where he received detailed reports of the size and status of the Batavian force heading for the Cape. The Admiralty had already responded to the threat by diverting substantial resources to the Cape: in addition to Elphinstone and Blankett's forces a convoy of transports led by Captain William Essington arrived on 28 May and a small squadron under Pringle followed on 28 July, joined that day by Mozelle with the most detailed reports to date of Lucas's movements. Subsequent reinforcements arrived from the squadron based in India, so that by August there were seven ships of the line and seven smaller vessels under Elphinstone's command and the garrison of the Cape stood at 9,400 British troops.

Saldanha Bay
Elphinstone was concerned that the Batavian force might not be sailing for the Cape at all. In May a powerful French frigate squadron under Contre-amiral Pierre César Charles de Sercey had sailed past the Cape without stopping, observed by HMS Sphynx, which it chased back to Simon's Town. If the Batavian force was sailing for the East Indies, it might bypass the Cape altogether. Elphinstone therefore decided to take his fleet out to sea to search for the Batavians. The fleet returned to Simon's Bay in a battered state on 12 August, to learn on arrival that Lucas's force lay at anchor to the north. The following day a storm swept the bay. Most of Elphinstone's ships were damaged: both  and  grounded, and  dragged anchors and was almost wrecked.

Lucas had arrived off the Cape on 26 July with no knowledge of Elphinstone's dispositions. He had more pressing concerns: it had been several months since his ships had sighted land and his supplies of drinking water were running dangerously low. A significant proportion of his crews were suffering from scurvy and he had decided to send these men to an encampment ashore to facilitate their recovery. Lucas even ordered that the sails on his ships be removed for repairs, rendering his ships temporarily immobile. On 9 August, Lucas was warned by a servant of a Dutch inhabitant of the Cape that a superior English force was present and that the Dutch population would not assist an attack on the British; he was strongly advised to sail away. Lucas, on hearing this, instead sailed deeper into the bay. Sir James Craig sent cavalry to Saldanha Bay to harry Batavian shore parties and organised the withdrawal of the local population and livestock to prevent their capture. He followed with a larger force under his own command.

Lucas held a council of war with his senior officers, debating whether an attack on Cape Town was practical or whether they should abandon the operation. By 16 August the decision had been made to sail for Île de France, but Lucas delayed, unwilling to leave his sick men ashore.

As the Batavian force prepared to sail, on 16 August Elphinstone's fleet appeared off the bay, led by the scouting frigate Crescent. He sent a letter to Lucas demanding that Lucas surrender, which demand Lucas refused. Ascertaining the strength of the Batavian force, in the evening of 16 August  Elphinstone led his fleet into the bay in line of battle and brought the line to anchor at close gunshot range to Lucas's ships. Trapped between the coast and the British, Lucas immediately raised a flag of truce. He then sent an officer to negotiate terms with Elphinstone. Elphinstone granted a delay to enable Lucas to consult his captains, but demanded assurances that the Batavian ships would not be damaged. Lucas gave his word of honor that this would not be done. The council of war then decided that a capitulation on terms should be sought. One of the terms proposed was that the Batavian officers would be allowed to go home on two of the Batavian frigates, designated as cartel ships. Elphinstone rejected these proposals, but offered to release the officers eventually, if they gave their parole. By 23:00, hopelessly outnumbered and with his crews in open rebellion, Lucas agreed to terms that dictated an almost unconditional surrender of the Batavian force. This was the next morning (17 August) agreed between Elphinstone and the Dutch parlimentaire
captain Claris; Lucas signed the capitulation that afternoon.

Orders of battle

Lucas's order of battle

Elphinstone's order of battle

Dutch merchant vessels captured
In addition to the naval vessels that capitulated, the British also detained five merchant vessels at Simon's Bay on 18 August.

Aftermath
The Royal Navy took all the Batavian warships into service. Elphinstone further attached the warships to the squadron at the Cape, an action the Admiralty criticised. Elphinstone returned to Britain in October 1796. His flagship Monarch passed right through the French fleet of the Expédition d'Irlande during a snow storm, anchoring in a disabled state at Crookhaven on 25 December. Following his return he was made Baron Keith for his capture and retention of the Cape Colony.

Most of the sailors and soldiers in the Dutch force were Germans and nearly all entered British service, either with the Royal Navy or the East India Company. Lucas and the Dutch officers later returned to Europe in the cartel Gertruida. One of the captured ships, HMS Dordrecht became notorious the following year when the crew mutinied at Saint Helena in imitation of the Spithead and Nore mutinies in Britain. Only the intervention of Captain Charles Brisbane, who threw a noose around the ringleader's neck and threatened death if the disobedience was repeated, succeeded in intimidating the rebellious seamen.

In the Batavian Republic Lucas's surrender caused popular outrage. On the admiral's return he faced a court martial by a Hoge Zeekrijgsraad (High Naval Court) impaneled by the National Assembly of the Batavian Republic on 19 May 1797. Lucas died on 21 June, a few days before the trial was to start, and the court therefore decided on 26 June to charge the prosecutor Jacobus Spoors with holding an inquiry, in which all witnesses were deposed. On the basis of this report the court decided on 14 December to lay the main responsibility for the surrender with Lucas, and to acquit the other officers.

Historians have held Lucas blameless for refusing to engage Elphinstone's force, which was far superior in both ships and men. Elphinstone's ships carried more than twice as many men as the Batavian expedition, even before the British troops ashore are taken into account. Lucas could only muster 1,972 men compared with the 4,291 under Elphinstone's command. The expedition has however been criticised for its lack of preparedness; while it is true that promised French support failed to appear, the Batavian troops were insufficient in number to threaten seriously the British garrison. As Parkinson noted: "what could be the point of landing a few hundred men on a shore bristling with English bayonets?" An unintended effect of the campaign however was to forestall a British invasion of Île de France, which Elphinstone had postponed to prepare for Lucas's arrival and which was ultimately cancelled entirely.

There were no further attacks on the Cape Colony during the war. The Treaty of Amiens in 1802 returned the Cape Colony and all other captured Dutch colonies, except Ceylon, to the Batavian Republic. The peace was short-lived, and early in the Napoleonic Wars the British prepared another expeditionary force. In 1806 the British again seized the Cape Colony following the Dutch defeat at the Battle of Blaauwberg. Cape Colony remained part of the British Empire until its independence as part of a unified South Africa in 1910.

Citations

References
 
 
 
 
 
 
 
 
 
 
 

Military history of the Cape Colony
Conflicts in 1796
1796 in the Cape Colony
1796 in Africa
Maritime history of South Africa
Naval battles involving the Batavian Republic
Naval battles involving Great Britain
Battles and conflicts without fatalities
Naval battles of the French Revolutionary Wars
1790s in the Cape Colony
Military history of the Batavian Republic